Vilacota (possibly from Aymara wila red, blood, quta lake, "red lake") is a  mountain in the Apolobamba mountain range in the Andes of Peru. It is located in the Puno Region, Sandia Province, in the districts Cuyocuyo and Quiaca. Vilacota is situated northwest of the mountain Ananea and northeast of Jorhuari.

References 

Mountains of Peru
Mountains of Puno Region